Frans Kuijper or Kuyper (6 April 1900 – 12 March 1987) was a Dutch water polo player and coach. He competed in the men's tournament at the 1928 Summer Olympics.

Kuyper became coach of the Dutch Water polo team. He coached the team at four Olympic competitions, including the 1952 Summer Olympics. He was the coach of the Dutch men's team at the 1950 European Championships, just after a rule change sped up the game, and his team used that to great effect, reaching the final and beating reigning European champion Italy 9-4.

References

External links
 entry on Kuyper
 

1900 births
1987 deaths
Dutch male water polo players
Olympic water polo players of the Netherlands
Water polo players at the 1928 Summer Olympics
Water polo players from Amsterdam
20th-century Dutch people